Oobi is an American children's television series produced by Little Airplane Productions. The show's concept is based on a technique used by puppeteers learning to lip-sync, in which they use their hands and a pair of ping pong balls in place of a puppet. The main characters are bare hand puppets with eyes and accessories, played by Muppet performers. The show aired on the Noggin channel, which was co-founded by Nickelodeon and Sesame Workshop.

Oobi has three seasons: one season of shorts and two seasons of long-form episodes. The shorts are 1–2 minutes each and were aired during commercial breaks. The long-form episodes are 10-13 minutes each. The show ran from 2000 to 2005, with reruns continuing until 2013. It ended with 48 shorts and 52 long-form episodes: a total of 100 individual stories. From 2015 to 2020, Oobi was available for streaming through the Noggin mobile app. The show received a variety of awards and nominations, including an Innovation Award from the Television Academy and two accolades from the Parents’ Choice Foundation.

In 2012, a foreign adaptation titled Oobi: Dasdasi premiered and ran for 78 episodes. It was filmed in Iran and produced by the Iranian network IRIB TV2. In July 2013, Oobi: Dasdasi was sold to broadcasters in Southeast Asia and Japan, becoming one of the first Iranian children's shows to air internationally.

Series overview

Episodes

Season 1 (shorts, 2000–2002) 
The first season was a collection of two-minute shorts that were played as interstitials between half-hour shows. 48 shorts have been confirmed. The shorts were not aired in a particular order, and are listed below in the order used on Screener and MSN TV.

Season 2 (2003–2004) 
For the show's second season, it became a long-form series with each episode lasting around 13 minutes. A total 26 long-form episodes were filmed for this season from January to February 2003. The first two episodes ("Camp Out!" and "Uma Swing!") premiered on April 7, 2003. The episodes are ordered below according to the lists on Nickelodeon's official websites and streaming services.

Season 3 (2004–2005) 
The show's third and last season was filmed from January to February 2004. Like the second season, it contains 26 episodes. The season premiered on September 6, 2004. The episodes are ordered below according to the lists on Nickelodeon's official websites and streaming services.

Notes

References

External links 
 
 
 

Oobi
Oobi